Chloe Early is London-based contemporary artist, known for her figurative paintings with street art influences.

Early life and education 
Early was born in 1980 and raised in Cork, Ireland. She was a student in printed textiles at the National College of Art and Design in Dublin, where she graduated in 2003. Early married artist Conor Harrington in 2013 after a decade together.

Style 
Early commonly works in oils on linen and aluminum panel. Her work captures the drama and emotion of Renaissance and early Baroque artwork. The tropes draw from historical work plays a clear role in her series "Suspended," partly inspired by Gian Lorenzo Bernini’s sculpture, The Ecstasy of Saint Theresa. Her work combines stylistic elements from Renaissance and Romantic painting with the rawness of contemporary life, “examining the sensitive and personal aspects of conflict, ambition and entropy in an opulent, cinematic style.” Common themes include redemption and hope.

Career 
Early has exhibited in group and solo shows in London, Los Angeles, Miami, New York, Cork and Dublin.

The music video for the song Iris (Hold Me Close) by U2 exhibits a coming of age story by Early. The artist contrasts concrete urbanism with lush landscapes, drawing from her childhood in Ireland and her impending motherhood.

Exhibitions 

– Sources:

References

External links 

 Chloe Early

Living people
Irish painters
Irish expatriates in the United Kingdom
Artists from London
1980 births